Gunther Glomb (born 17 August 1930 in Germany; died 13 August 2015 in Austria) was a German football manager who last worked as head coach of the Thailand national football team.

Career 
Glomb started his managerial career with Bonner SC, After that, he coached SpVg Frechen 20. In 1968, he was appointed head coach of the Thailand national football team, a position he held until 1975.

References

External links 
 
 Günther Glomb
 Glomb and the King – A Short Story
 "I was the intelligence beast"
 The club mourns the loss of Glomb and Schweinberger 
 In Memoriam of Günther Glomb

1930 births
2015 deaths
German footballers
Association football forwards
1. FC Nürnberg players
Wuppertaler SV players
German football managers
Bonner SC managers
Thailand national football team managers
West German expatriate football managers
West German expatriate sportspeople in Thailand
Expatriate football managers in Thailand
West German footballers
West German football managers
Silesian-German people
German refugees
World War II refugees
Footballers from Nuremberg